The United States ambassador to Belarus is the official representative of the president of the United States to the head of state of Belarus.

Until 1991 the Byelorussian Soviet Socialist Republic had been a constituent SSR of the Soviet Union. Upon the breakup of the USSR, the Supreme Soviet of Belarus declared itself independent of the Soviet Union on August 25, 1991, and renamed itself the Republic of Belarus on September 19, 1991. The United States recognized Belarus December 26, 1991. An embassy was established in the capital, Minsk, on January 31, 1992, with John Ford as Chargé d’Affaires ad interim. Relations between the United States and Belarus have been continuous since that time.

The U.S. Embassy in Belarus is located in Minsk. Since March 12, 2008, when Ambassador Karen Stewart was formally recalled for consultations, there has been no accredited U.S. Ambassador in Minsk.  All but five U.S. diplomats were declared persona non grata on April 30, 2008.

Ambassadors

Notes

See also
Belarus – United States relations
Foreign relations of Belarus
Ambassadors of the United States

References
United States Department of State: Background notes on Belarus

External links
 United States Department of State: Chiefs of Mission for Belarus
 United States Department of State: Belarus
 United States Embassy in Minsk

Belarus
 
United States